The Peterson MAP-3 Medena is an American shoulder-wing, single-seat, FAI Open Class glider that was designed and constructed by Max A. Peterson, first flying in 1966.

Design and development
Peterson completed the Medena prototype and flew it in 1966. The designation indicates the designer's initials.

The aircraft is of mixed construction, with an all-metal structure and a fiberglass cockpit section. The  span wings employ a NACA 64(3)-618 airfoil and mount both spoilers and half-span flaps. The flaps can be raised 5° for cruise flight and deployed to 60° for glidepath control on landing. The landing gear is a retractable monowheel.

Only one Medena was constructed.

Operational history
The prototype's wings and tail were damaged in a wind storm in 1967 and the aircraft was rebuilt to incorporate modifications to the tail and aft fuselage. Peterson sold the Medana to Joe Gray in 1971. Ownership transferred to Sam Phillips in May 1975.  Ownership transferred to Donald Young/Oren Irich in May 1978. In August 2011 the aircraft was still on the US Federal Aviation Administration registry, although the agency listed its status as "in question"

Specifications (Medena)

See also

References

1960s United States sailplanes
Homebuilt aircraft
Aircraft first flown in 1966